Marcia A. Tillisch (October 8, 1963 – November 20, 2014) was an American curler. She was a three-time national champion, once in women's and twice in mixed, and represented the United States at the 1995 World Women's Curling Championship.

Curling career 
Tillisch played lead for Lisa Schoeneberg in 1995 when they won the gold medal at the US National Championships with an undefeated 9–0 record. As national champions, Tillisch, Schoeneberg, and their other teammates  Amy Wright and Lori Mountford continued on to represent the United States at the 1995 World Championship in Brandon, Manitoba. There they missed the playoffs, finishing tied for fifth with a 4–5 record.  Tillisch was the top-ranked team at the championship with a 85% shooting percentage.

Personal life 
Tillisch was introduced to curling by her husband, Cal Tillisch. They both were very active in their local curling club in Wausau, Wisconsin.

Teams

Women's

Mixed

References

External links 

1963 births
2014 deaths
American female curlers
American curling champions
21st-century American women